Jean-Baptiste Chaussard (4 September 1729, Tonnerre - 26 June 1818, Paris) was a French architect to the king, associated with Pierre Contant d'Ivry and Jean-Michel Chevotet. He was also related to Chevotet, nephew to the royal painter Jean Valade and father of the revolutionary Pierre-Jean-Baptiste Chaussard.

References

1729 births
1818 deaths
18th-century French architects